General Murtala Muhammed became head of state in Nigeria on 29 July 1975, when he assumed power after a coup that deposed General Yakubu Gowon.
On assuming office, he replaced the military governors of the twelve states that had been appointed by his predecessor.
On 13 February 1976 he was assassinated in an attempted coup, and replaced by General Olusegun Obasanjo, who replaced most of his appointees.

Government of Nigeria
Politics of Nigeria